Aqueity was an  coastal tanker which was built by A & J Inglis Ltd, Glasgow in 1945 for the Ministry of War Transport (MoWT) as Empire Belgrave. In 1947 she was sold to F T Everard and Sons and renamed Aqueity, being lost later that year when she struck a mine and sank off the coast of the Netherlands.

Description
Empire Belgrave was built by A. & J. Inglis Ltd, Glasgow. She was yard number 1299. Empire Belgrave was launched on 16 March 1945 and completed on 19 June. Her GRT was 890, DWT 900 with a NRT of 382.

Career
Empire Belgrave was managed for the MoWT by the Anglo-Saxon Petroleum Co Ltd. Postwar management passed to Shell Tankers. In 1947, Empire Belgrave was sold to F T Everard & Sons Ltd, Greenhithe and renamed Aqueity. On 11 November 1947, she struck a mine off Terschelling, the Netherlands and sank.

Official Numbers and Code Letters
Official Numbers were a forerunner to IMO Numbers. The ship had the UK Official Number 169440 and the Code Letters GKJW.

Propulsion
The ship was propelled by a two-stroke Single Cycle, Single Action diesel engine which had four cylinders of  diameter by  stroke. It was built by British Polar Engines Ltd, Glasgow.

References

1945 ships
Ships built on the River Clyde
Ministry of War Transport ships
Empire ships
World War II tankers
Tankers of the United Kingdom
Shipwrecks of the Netherlands
Maritime incidents in 1947
Ships sunk by mines
Ships built by Harland and Wolff